Murex is a genus of medium to large sized predatory tropical sea snails. These are carnivorous marine gastropod molluscs in the family Muricidae, commonly called "murexes" or "rock snails".

The common name murex is still used for many species in the family Muricidae which were originally given the Latin generic name Murex in the past, but have more recently been regrouped into different newer genera.

The word murex was used by Aristotle in reference to these kinds of snails, thus making it one of the oldest classical seashell names still in use by the scientific community.

Fossil records
This genus is known in the fossil records from the Cretaceous to the Quaternary (age range: from 125.45 to 0.0 million years ago). Fossils of species within this genus have been found all over the world. There are about 25 known extinct species.

Distribution
Murex is solely an Indo-Pacific genus, as demonstrated by Ponder & Vokes (1988). The species from the western Atlantic that were formerly considered to belong to the genus Murex are now placed in the genus Haustellum.

Habitat
Most Murex species live in the intertidal or shallow subtidal zone, among rocks and corals.

Shell description
This genus includes many showy members, their elongate shells highly sculptured with spines or fronds. The inner surfaces of their ornate shells are often brightly colored.

Human use
Costly and labor-intensive dyes Tyrian purple (or royal purple) and tekhelet were historically made by the ancient Phoenicians and Jews respectively, using mucus from the hypobranchial gland of two species commonly referred to as "murex", Murex brandaris and Murex trunculus, which are the older names for Haustellum brandaris  (Bolinus brandaris)  and Hexaplex trunculus (Phyllonatus trunculus). This dye is a rare animal-produced organobromine compound, which the snails make using a specific bromoperoxidase enzyme that operates on dissolved bromide in sea water.
 
This dye was used in royal robes, other kinds of special ceremonial or ritual garments, or garments indicating high rank.  It is hypothesised that the dye was the same dye as that which featured prominently in the ancient Temple in Jerusalem, the clothing of the High Priest (or Kohen Gadol) officiating there; it is sometimes still used by Jews today in the ritual fringes (tzitzit) on four-cornered garments.  A consensus has yet to be reached regarding the Biblical source of the "blue" dye.

Species 
The genus Murex, as originally defined by Linnaeus, encompassed many taxa that are now placed elsewhere in the superfamily Muricoidea. During the 19th century, the definition  of Murex was restricted by Lamarck and his contemporaries first to species in the family Muricidae, and then was limited even further to the subfamilies Muricinae and Ocenebrinae. Malacologists of the 19th century including Kiener, Reeve, Küster & Kobelt and Sowerby treated all muricoid forms as belonging to Murex. This is the main reason why Murex has so many synonyms.

The World Register of Marine Species (WoRMS) lists the following species  with accepted names within the genus Murex. The subgenera are considered alternate representations.

 Murex acanthostephes Watson, 1883
 Murex aduncospinosus G.B. Sowerby II, 1841: 
 Murex africanus Ponder & Vokes, 1988
 Murex altispira Ponder & Vokes, 1988 Caltrop murex
 Murex antelmei Viader, 1938
 Murex brevispina Lamarck, 1822 Short-spined murex
 Murex carbonnieri (Jousseaume, 1881) Carbonnier's murex
 Murex concinnus Reeve, 1845
 Murex coppingeri E. A. Smith, 1884
 Murex djarianensis Martin, 1895
 Murex djarianensis poppei  (synonym : Murex (Murex) poppei Houart, 1979)
 Murex echinoides Houart, 2011
 Murex falsitribulus Ponder & Vokes, 1988
 Murex forskoehlio Röding, 1798
 Murex huangi Houart, 2010
 Murex hystricosus Houart & Dharma, 2001
 Murex indicus Houart, 2011
 Murex kerslakae Ponder & Vokes, 1988
 Murex megapex Neubert, 1998
 † Murex noae Holten, 1802 
 Murex occa G.B. Sowerby II, 1834 Harrowed murex
 Murex pecten Lightfoot, 1786 ': Venus comb murex
 Murex pecten soelae
 Murex philippinensis Parth, 1994 
 Murex protocrassus Houart, 1990
 Murex queenslandicus Ponder & Vokes, 1988
 Murex salomonensis Parth, 1994
 Murex scolopax Dillwyn, 1817 False venus comb, woodcock murex
 Murex somalicus Parth, 1990
 Murex spectabilis Ponder & Vokes, 1988
 Murex spicatus Ponder & Vokes, 1988
 Murex spinastreptos Houart, 2010
 Murex surinamensis Okutani, 1982
 Murex tenuirostrum Lamarck, 1822
 Murex ternispina Lamarck, 1822
 Murex trapa Roding, 1798 Rare-spined murex
 Murex tribulus Linnaeus, 1758, 1758: Caltrop murex
 Murex tribulus spicatus
  Murex tribulus tenuirostrum
  Murex tribulus tenuirostrum africanus
 Murex tribulus ternispina
 Murex troscheli Lischke, 1868 Troschel's murex

Species mentioned as species in current use in the Indo-Pacific Molluscan Database (OBIS) 
 Murex singaporensis A.Adams, 1853 

Species brought into synonymy 
 Murex aedonius Watson, 1896: synonym of Coralliophila aedonia (Watson, 1885)
 Murex afer Gmelin, 1791: synonym of Afer afer (Gmelin, 1791)
 Murex alocatus: synonym of Pterymarchia barclayana (H. Adams, 1873)
 Murex antillarum : Antilles murex: synonym of Siratus articulatus (Reeve, 1845)
 Murex argo Clench & Farfante, 1945: synonym of Chicoreus (Triplex) spectrum (Reeve, 1846)
 Murex belcheri Hinds, 1843 : synonym of Forreria belcheri (Hinds, 1843) 
 Murex bellus Reeve, 1845: synonym of Vokesimurex bellus (Reeve, 1845) 
 Murex blakeanus Vokes, 1967: synonym of Vokesimurex blakeanus (Vokes, 1967)
 Murex brandaris Linnaeus, 1758: synonym of Bolinus brandaris (Linnaeus, 1758)
 Murex canaliculatus Linnaeus, 1758: synonym of Busycotypus canaliculatus (Linnaeus, 1758) 
 Murex capitellum Linnaeus, 1758: synonym of Vasum capitellum (Linnaeus, 1758)
 Murex corallinus Scacchi, 1836: synonym of Ocinebrina aciculata (Lamarck, 1822)
 Murex corneus Linnaeus, 1758: synonym of Euthria cornea (Linnaeus, 1758) 
 Murex coronatus Born, 1778: synonym of Pseudovertagus aluco (Linnaeus, 1758) 
 Murex edwardsii: synonym of Ocinebrina edwardsii (Payraudeau, 1826)
 Murex garciai Petuch, 1987: synonym of Vokesimurex garciai (Petuch, 1987) 
 Murex gubbi Reeve, 1849: synonym of Chicocenebra gubbi (Reeve, 1849)
 Murex inconspicuus G.B. Sowerby II, 1841: synonym of Ocinebrina aciculata (Lamarck, 1822)
 Murex intertextus Helbling, 1779: synonym of Cumia reticulata
 Murex jickelii Tapparone Canefri, 1875: synonym of Naquetia jickelii (Tapparone Canefri, 1875) 
 Murex lindajoycae Petuch, 1987: synonym of Vokesimurex lindajoycae (Petuch, 1987) 
 Murex longicornis Dunker, 1864: synonym of Chicoreus longicornis (Dunker, 1864) 
 Murex maroccensis Gmelin, 1791: synonym of Fusinus maroccensis
 Murex monodon Sowerby, 1825: synonym of Chicoreus (Chicoreus) cornucervi (Röding, 1798)
 Murex nassa Gmelin, 1791: synonym of Leucozonia nassa (Gmelin, 1791)
 Murex nebula Montagu, 1803: synonym of Bela nebula (Montagu, 1803)
 Murex peritus Hinds, 1844a: synonym of Favartia (Favartia) perita (Hinds, 1844)
 Murex pistacia Reeve, 1845: synonym of Ocinebrina aciculata (Lamarck, 1822)
 Murex purpuroides Dunker: synonym of Vaughtia purpuroides (Reeve, 1845)
 Murex recurvirostris: synonym of Vokesimurex recurvirostrum (Broderip, 1833)
 Murex rota Sowerby: synonym of Homalocantha anatomica (Perry, 1811)
 Murex rubidus: synonym of Vokesimurex rubidus (F.C. Baker, 1897)
 Murex serratospinosus Dunker, 1883: synonym of  Vokesimurex mindanaoensis (G.B. Sowerby II, 1841)
 Murex subaciculatus Locard, 1886: synonym of Ocinebrina aciculata (Lamarck, 1822)
 Murex taxus Dillwyn, 1817: synonym of Clavatula taxea (Röding, 1798)
 † Murex textilis Brocchi, 1814: synonym of † Rimosodaphnella textilis (Brocchi, 1814) 
 Murex triqueter: synonym of Naquetia triqueter (Born, 1778)
 Murex tulipa Linnaeus, 1758: synonym of Fasciolaria tulipa (Linnaeus, 1758)
 Murex turbinellus Linnaeus, 1758: synonym of Vasum turbinellus (Linnaeus, 1758)
 Murex vittatus Broderip, 1833: synonym of Favartia (Favartia) vittata (Broderip, 1833)

References

 Merle, D., Garrigues, B. & Pointier, J.-P. 2011. Fossil and Recent Muricidae of the World, Part Muricinae. 648 pp., 182 colour plates, Hackenheim. .
 Ponder, W.F. & E.H. Vokes. 1988. A revision of the Indo-West Pacific fossil and Recent species of Murex s.s. and Haustellum (Mollusca: Gastropoda: Muricidae). Records of the Australian Museum, Supplement 8. 160 pp.

External links 

 Aristotle, 350 B.C.E. A history of animals

 
Muricinae
Extant Cretaceous first appearances
Gastropod genera
Taxa named by Carl Linnaeus